Aqchelu (also Romanized as Āqchelū and Oqchelū; also known as Okhchaloo, Okh Chalū, Ukhchalu, and Ūkhchelū) is a village in Sardaran Rural District, in the Central District of Kabudarahang County, Hamadan Province, Iran. At the 2006 census, its population was 464, in 114 families.

References 

Populated places in Kabudarahang County